Barsine defecta is a moth of the family Erebidae first described by Francis Walker in 1854. It is found in Sri Lanka, Nepal, Thailand and Vietnam. It is the type species of genus Barsine.

References

Moths of Asia
Moths described in 1854